Ljutice is a village in the municipality of Požega, western Serbia. According to the 2002 census, the village has a population of 432 people.

References

Populated places in Zlatibor District